XHEDT-FM is a radio station in Toluca, State of Mexico, Mexico. Broadcasting on 93.3 FM, XHEDT is owned by Grupo Siete Comunicación and is known as Crystal FM with a gold-based Regional Mexican format.

History

XHEDT received its concession on August 5, 1994. It was owned by Enrique Arturo González de Aragón Ortíz.

In 2017, XHEDT and XHMLO-FM in Tenancingo were the last Grupo Siete-owned stations to ditch the Bengala grupera format and moved to Crystal.

References

Radio stations in the State of Mexico